Carabus dufouri baguenai is a subspecies of black coloured beetle in the family Carabidae that is endemic to Spain.

References

dufouri baguenai
Beetles described in 1926
Endemic fauna of Spain